AKTA TV was a Romanian DTH platform. It belonged to Digital Cable Systems, a telecommunication operator which offered satellite, cable television, internet and telephony in over 2,500 locations in Romania.

It was launched in Romania in June 2005 under the name Max TV. From 2008, the official name was AKTA TV.

On July 27, 2020, AKTA was taken over by RCS-RDS SA (Digi).

Launch dates
 9 September 2005 - HBO and Cinemax become available in the AKTA TV package.
 9 March 2006 - Digital Cable System launches an offer for its new users.
 18 February 2007 - Kanal D becomes available in the AKTA TV package.
 1 April 2007 - Romantica becomes available in the AKTA TV package.
 9 April 2007 - Antena 2 becomes available in the AKTA TV package.
 13 April 2007 - HBO Comedy becomes available in the AKTA TV package.

Channels

Basic
 AKTA Info
 TVR 1
 TVR 2
 TVR 3
 Antena 1
 Antena Stars
 Pro TV
 Pro Gold
 Pro 2
 Kanal D
 Prima TV
 Film Cafe
 B1 TV
 National TV
 Muscel TV
 TVH
 Alfa Omega TV
 National 24 Plus
 Neptun TV
 Credo
 Columna TV

Movies
 Pro Cinema
 Diva
 AMC
 TCM
 AXN
 AXN Black
 AXN White
 HBO
 HBO Comedy
 Cinemax
 TV1000
 Film Cafe
 Universal Channel
 Filmbox
 Filmbox Plus
 Filmbox Family
 Bollywood TV Film
 Bollywood Classic

Sports
 Eurosport
 Eurosport 2
 Pro X
 Telekom Sport 1
 Auto Motor & Sport
 Extreme Sports Channel
 Fishing & Hunting
 Telekom Sport 2

Children
 C8
 Boomerang
 Cartoon Network
 Disney Channel
 Disney Junior
 Minimax
 Megamax

Lifestyle
 Happy Channel
 Fashion TV
 TLC
 TV Paprika
 Fine Living Channel

Documentary / Reality
 National Geographic Channel
 Animal Planet
 CBS Reality
 Discovery Channel
 Discovery Science
 Discovery Travel & Living
 Discovery World
 History Channel
 Investigation Discovery
 Travel Channel
 Viasat Explorer
 Viasat History
 Viasat Nature

Music
 MTV Romania
 VH 1
 U TV
 Kiss TV
 Etno TV
 Dibi TV

News
 Realitatea TV
 Antena 3
 The Money Channel
 Romania TV
 GiGa TV
 Transilvania L!VE

Religious
 Speranta TV
 Trinitas TV

Teleshopping
 TopShop TV

Adult
 FreeX TV
 XDream TV

References

External links
 AKTA TV 

Television in Romania
Direct broadcast satellite services
2005 establishments in Romania
2021 disestablishments in Romania
Companies based in Bucharest